Goldson is a surname. Notable people with the surname include:

 Annie Goldson, New Zealand film academic
 Connor Goldson (born 1992), English football defender
 Dashon Goldson (born 1984), American football safety
 Kimberly Goldson, American fashion designer
 Philip Goldson (1923–2001), Belizean newspaper editor, activist and politician

See also
Goldson, Oregon, unincorporated community in Lane County, Oregon, United States
Philip S. W. Goldson International Airport (IATA: BZE, ICAO: MZBZ), an airport that serves Belize City